Redon Xhixha (born 14 July 1998) is an Albanian professional footballer who plays as a striker for the Azerbaijani side Qarabağ FK in Azerbaijan Premier League and Albania national football team. 
.

Club career

Laçi
On 20 July 2017, Xhixha signed his first professional contract and joined Kategoria Superiore side Laçi. He was an unused substitute in the opening matchday away against Partizani on 10 September, in which Laçi caused an upset by winning 2–0. Three days later, Xhixha made his Albanian Cup debut in the first leg of first round where he bagged 5 goals in a 12–0 hammering of Sopoti. He dedicated the goals to his family.

He made his first Kategoria Superiore appearance on 24 September in matchday 2 against Kukësi, finished in a 3–0 away loss, and netted his first league goals one week later in a 2–0 home win over Vllaznia.

He left the club at the end of the 2020–21 campaign after his contract expired.

Qarabağ
On 24 January 2023, Azerbaijan Premier League club Qarabağ announced the signing of Xhixha on a contract until 30 June 2026.

Personal life
His favourite players are Hamdi Salihi and Robert Lewandowski.

Career statistics

Club

Honours 
Tirana
Kategoria Superiore: 2021–22
Albanian Supercup: 2022

References

External links
Redon Xhixha profile FSHF.org

1998 births
Living people
People from Laç
Albanian footballers
Association football forwards
Albania under-21 international footballers
Kategoria Superiore players
KF Laçi players
KF Tirana players
Albania international footballers